The Church of San Francisco is a church of Catholic worship under the patronage of Saint Francis of Assisi in the city of Bogotá, in Colombia. It is located in the Veracruz neighborhood, on Avenida Jiménez with Carrera Séptima, where it constitutes a complex made up of the churches of la Orden Tercera and La Veracruz.

History

It was built between 1557 and 1566 on land donated by Archbishop Juan de los Barrios to the Franciscan brothers, on the right bank of the Vicachá River, later called the San Francisco River. The original construction had an extension between 1586 and 1611. In 1623 the main altarpiece was built.

In the 18th century, the building suffered several damages to its structures due to the 1785 earthquake, after which the tower had to be rebuilt. The work would be finished in 1794. The church was only made up of a nave to which small chapels were annexed on its right side. When the structure was seriously affected during the earthquake of 1785, these chapels were integrated into a second nave after the restoration work directed by Domingo Esquiaqui, which was completed on March 25, 1794, date on which Archbishop Baltasar Jaime Martínez Compañón consecrated the church. Years later the interior of the church was intervened by the Capuchin friar Domingo de Petrés.

The church was expropriated in 1861 by Tomás Cipriano de Mosquera, until 1881, during which the chaplain Friar Ramón Cáceres was in charge of its administration. The church formed a complex with an adjacent convent that covered two city blocks and had three two-story cloisters. The cloisters, however, disappeared when the Government of Cundinamarca building was built in its place in the current Palacio de San Francisco in 1917, the work of Gaston Lelarge and Arturo Jaramillo.

To the present the historical documents of the original church that survive are the church complete façade, the tower, the altarpiece, and the presbytery. The last restoration of the church was carried out between 1988 and 1990.

It is currently the oldest preserved church in Bogotá, it is located on the northwest corner of Avenida Jiménez with Carrera Séptima, diagonal to the TransMilenio's Museo del Oro station. This building is the one with a Mudéjar ceiling, one of the best in New Granada, the altarpiece is the most representative of the Viceroyalty of New Granada made between 1593 and 1611, this altarpiece has Renaissance elements, the altarpiece has grotesque elements in its first body in the second body contains all the saints with their attributes and is topped by all the apostles; in the center at the top is the eternal father with one hand leading the world and with the other pointing to the Franciscans.

Gallery

See also
List of buildings in Bogotá

References

Roman Catholic churches in Bogotá
Roman Catholic churches completed in 1566
Towers completed in 1794
Spanish Colonial architecture in Colombia